L'Anse Creuse Public Schools is a collection of K-12 schools located in Macomb County, Michigan. The district stretches from as far north as 24 Mile Road in Chesterfield Township down to Jefferson Avenue and I-94 in St. Clair Shores. The district occupies  of the Metro Detroit region. The district is bordered by the Chippewa Valley Public School District, the Anchor Bay Public School District and the Lakeshore Public School District among other smaller districts.

Schools
The district currently has nine elementary schools: Atwood, Carkenord, Graham, Green, Higgins, Lobbestael, South River, Tenniswood and Yacks.  The district is also served by four middle schools: Middle School South, Middle School Central, Middle School North and Middle School East and two high schools: L'Anse Creuse High School and L'Anse Creuse High School - North, which is a National Blue Ribbon school.  There is also the Fredrick V. Pankow Vocational Center and the DiAnne M. Pellerin Center for Alternative and Adult Education.  The administration for the district is housed at the Harry L. Wheeler Office as of September 4, 2012. Also Chesterfield Elementary closed on September 8, 2015, the start of the 2015-2016 School Year.

Transportation 
The L'Anse Creuse Transportation system serves the district, with its home-base adjacent to the Harry L. Wheeler Community Center and Administrative Offices and Larry F. Brender Support Services.

References

External links
 L'Anse Creuse Public Schools Website

School districts in Michigan
Education in Macomb County, Michigan